Klaas Ooms (9 June 1917 – 17 January 1970) was a Dutch football forward who was a member of the Netherlands' squad at the 1938 FIFA World Cup. However, he never made an appearance for the national team. He also played for DWV.

References

External links
 FIFA profile

1917 births
1970 deaths
Dutch footballers
AFC DWS players
Association football forwards
1938 FIFA World Cup players
Footballers from Amsterdam